Xinghua Subdistrict is a subdistrict of Longfeng District, in the south of Daqing, Heilongjiang, People's Republic of China. , it has six residential communities under its administration.

See also
List of township-level divisions of Heilongjiang

References

Township-level divisions of Heilongjiang
Daqing